Wei-Heng Chen is a Chinese linguist who is a professor of English and linguistics at Beijing Language and Culture University. Chen was the education consul of China at the Chinese Consulate-General, Los Angeles.

Work
Chen is noted for his work in linguistics, particularly on the phonological consequences of grammaticalization and lexicalization. His doctoral dissertation at Peking University in 2004 was entitled, Northern Yu Dialects and Chinese Morphonology, and in 2011 he wrote Correlation between Syllable and Meaning and Between Phonology and Lexicalization, Grammaticalization and Subjectification: Towards a Theory on Morphophonology From Northern Yu Chinese Dialects.

Chen's work emphasizes the typological differences between monosyllabic languages (with an obligatory match between syllable and morpheme, with exceptions of loanwords or morphological derivations such as reduplicatives, diminutives and other morphological alternations) and non-monosyllabic languages (including disyllabic Austronesian languages, Semito-Hamitic languages with tri-consonantal word roots, Indo-European languages without an obligatory match between sound units (syllables) and meaning units (morpheme or word, despite an assumed majority of monosyllabic, reconstructed word stems and roots in the Proto-Indo-European hypothesis), a difference initiated by German linguist Wilhelm von Humboldt (who put the Sino-Tibetan languages in sharp contrast to other languages in linguistic relativity.

Works

References

Year of birth missing (living people)
Living people
Chinese phonologists
Historical linguists
Linguists from China
Linguists of Chinese
Beijing Language and Culture University alumni